Courbouzon may refer to:
 Courbouzon, Jura a commune in the French region of Franche-Comté
 Courbouzon, Loir-et-Cher, a commune in the French region of Centre